Tom Kleinlein is the former director of athletics for Georgia Southern University. He previously served as assistant athletic director for Kent State University and Arizona State University. Kleinlein attended college at Wake Forest University, where he played on the offensive line for the Wake Forest Demon Deacons football team between 1989 and 1992. Kleinlein resigned his position at Georgia Southern on January 3, 2020. Kleinlein was named deputy athletic director at the University of Mississippi on January 4, 2020.

References

External links
 Ole Miss profile
 Georgia Southern profile

Year of birth missing (living people)
Living people
American football offensive linemen
Arizona State Sun Devils athletic directors
Georgia Southern Eagles athletic directors
Kent State University people
Wake Forest Demon Deacons football players